Matanui is a genus of triplefin blennies (family Tripterygiidae), they are endemic to New Zealand.

Species
 Chatham deep-water triplefin, Matanui bathytaton (Hardy, 1989)
 Deepwater triplefin, Matanui profundum (Fricke & Roberts, 1994)

Etymology
The name Matanui is derived from the Māori words mata meaning "eye" and nui meaning "large", a reference to its large eyes.

References

 
Tripterygiidae